Tempe Center for the Arts (TCA) is a publicly owned performing and visual arts center in Tempe, Arizona. It opened in September 2007 and houses a 600-seat proscenium theater, a 200-seat studio theater and a 3,500-square-foot gallery. Its Lakeside Room seats 200 and overlooks Tempe Town Lake, with views of the Papago Buttes and Camelback Mountain.

Architecture
The building was designed by Barton Myers Associates of Los Angeles and Architekton of Tempe. A citizens group, formed in 1998, spearheaded a ballot initiative to create an arts center.  The resulting increase in the sales tax of 0.1% was used to fund seed money for the management, design, and construction of the facility.

At the entrance, environmental designer Ned Kahn uses 8,000 embedded marbles and tiny mirrors to create a shimmery sunlit effect at the Center’s marquee. He echoes this shimmering effect on the west wall of the Lakeside room where an array of mirrors captures and digitizes the available light reflecting off the Center’s negative edge pool.[1]

Unlike most theaters, this lobby is open to the public without a ticket and becomes a popular gathering place that brings art and community together while enhancing the Tempe landscape, promoting positive quality of life issues related to sustainability, recreation, and culture.[1]

A management firm (Kitchell CEM) was selected by the city government to oversee a three-phase design competition, leading to the selection of the design team in 2000.  Following public input, the design was completed in 2003. Construction began in April 2004 and took 40 months. The Center was completed in August 2007, with a grand opening on September 9, 2007.

The Center features a roof made of complex geometric folded plates.  The roof is visible from the surrounding freeways and the man-made Tempe Town Lake, which occupies the natural watercourse of the Salt River, immediately adjacent to the site.  It is also visible by many airplanes landing at Phoenix Sky Harbor International Airport, two miles west of the building.

Five public art pieces were included in the design:

 Entry Marquee – Ned Kahn
 Fireplace– trueNorth - Mayme Kratz and Mark Ryan
 Fountain Reflections – Ned Kahn
 Lobby Carpet – Ramona Saskiestewa
 Aurora - Brower Hatcher

The Center includes the Gallery at TCA, a visual arts gallery featuring free exhibits of two- and three-dimensional artwork by local and internationally recognized artists.

Current Residents Artists

 Arizona Wind Symphony
 Black Theatre Troupe (Guest Artists)
 Bridge Initiative: Women in Theatre
 Childsplay
 CONDER/dance
 Desert Dance Theatre
 Hayden's Ferry Chamber Music Series
 Lakeshore Music
 Scottsdale Musical Theatre Company
 Stray Cat Theatre
 Tandem Duo
 Tempe Comedy
 Tempe Symphony Orchestra
 Tempe Winds

Past Resident Artists
Home to city-produced programs:

 Songwriters' Showcase
 In the Spotlight
 Tempe Poetry in April
 Art After Work
 Finally Friday

Photo gallery

See also
 List of concert halls

Notes

External links 

 Official website
 Tempe Center for the Arts / Architekton, ArchDaily

Arts centers in Arizona
Performing arts centers in Arizona
Buildings and structures in Tempe, Arizona
Arizona culture
Art museums and galleries in Arizona
Barton Myers buildings
Tourist attractions in Tempe, Arizona
Music venues completed in 2007
Theatres completed in 2007